Omniscience is the fifth live album by the American experimental rock band Swans. It was recorded from shows on their 1992 world tour. It is out of print and has never been reissued. The front cover photograph is by Larry Lame with many Deryk Thomas paintings in the booklet.

Critical reception 

Trouser Press called it "a nicely-presented live document". Allmusic critic Ned Raggett wrote: "Ending with a fine version of "God Bless America" and the new, slow-grinding "Omnipotent," Omniscience is yet another excellent addition to Swans' body of work."

Track listing
 "Mother's Milk" - 4:37
 "Pow R Sac" - 3:38
 "Will Serve" - 3:36
 "Her" - 8:43
 "Black Eyed Dog" (Nick Drake) - 3:35
 "Amnesia" - 6:19
 "Love of Life" - 8:32
 "Untitled" - 2:29
 "Other Side of the World" - 3:57
 "Rutting" - 2:07
 "God Loves America" - 6:31
 "Omnipotent" - 2:46

Personnel
 Michael Gira - vocals, guitar
 Jarboe - vocals, keyboards
 Clinton Steele - guitar
 Algis Kizys - bass guitar
 Vincent Signorelli - drums

References

External links
Swans official website - Omniscience

1992 live albums
Swans (band) live albums
Young God Records live albums
Albums produced by Michael Gira